Karlskrona HK is a Swedish ice hockey club located in Karlskrona, Sweden, established in 2001. They played three seasons in the top-tier Swedish Hockey League (SHL) between the 2015–16 and 2017–18 seasons. Their home arena is NKT Arena Karlskrona which has a capacity of 5,050 spectators.

History
Following an impressive 2014–15 season, Karlskrona HK qualified for the SHL, only 14 years after the club was established. Important factors for the promotion were strong team play, reliable goaltending by Patrick Galbraith and offensive production by Joel Kellman (39 points) and Filip Cruseman (20 goals).

The club was relegated back to the second-tier league following the 2017–18 SHL season. After being denied the mandatory elite license, the club was further relegated to the third-tier league Hockeyettan following the 2019–20 HockeyAllsvenskan season; they were replaced by Väsby IK HK. The club was saved from bankruptcy by a fund raiser by fans and alumni including former player Joel Kellman and Swedish athlete and entrepreneur Jon Olsson.

Season-by-season records
updated December 1, 2013

Players

Current roster

References

External links
Karlskrona HK Official Website

Ice hockey teams in Sweden
Sport in Karlskrona
2001 establishments in Sweden
Ice hockey clubs established in 2001
Ice hockey teams in Blekinge County